Murodoullo Amrillaev (born 5 May 1972, in Dushanbe, Soviet Union) is a Tajikistan and Russian draughts player (Russian and International draughts), world champion in draughts-64 (Russian version) in 1993 for. Since 1995 lived in Sterlitamak, Russia. Played for the club «Bashneft». International grandmaster (GMI) since 1994.

References

External links
Profile in KNDB
Murodoullo Amrillaev. Site «Bashneft»
Rating list Men on 01.01.2015//section-64

1956 births
Living people
People from Sterlitamak
Russian draughts players
Russian people of Tajikistani descent
Soviet draughts players
Players of international draughts
Players of Russian draughts